Joshua Masters (born 6 April 1995 in Maidstone) is an English professional squash player. As of November 2018, he was ranked number 53 in the world.

References

1995 births
Living people
English male squash players